Grimcutty is a 2022 monster horror film written and directed by John Ross. The film stars Sara Wolfkind, Shannyn Sossamon, Usman Ally and Callan Farris. Produced by 20th Digital Studio and Capture, it was distributed in United States by Hulu, in Latin America by Star+, and internationally by Disney+.

Plot 
A young teen must work with her little brother to stop an internet meme that has come to life.
The outline of the story is a direct reference to the Momo Challenge hoax, an internet moral panic that reached its peak in 2019.

Cast 

 Sara Wolfkind as Asha Chaudhry, Amir and Leah's daughter and Kamran's older sister. She is also the second victim of the Grimcutty.
 Shannyn Sossamon as Leah Chaudhry, Amir's wife and the mother of Asha and Kamran
 Usman Ally as Amir Chaudhry, Leah's husband and the father of Asha and Kamran
 Alona Tal as Melinda Jaynes, Brandon Jaynes' mom and the one who started the Grimcutty post
 Tate Moore as Cassidy Johnston, the first and only commenter of Asha's first video and the fourth victim of the Grimcutty. She knew about the Grimcutty before Asha and Kayla.
 Callan Farris as Kamran Chaudhry, Amir and Leah's son and Asha's little brother. He is also the third victim of the Grimcutty.
 Brenda Schmid as Tracy Johnston, Cassidy's mom
 Kritian Flores as Jackson Martinez
 Joel Hebner as Grimcutty
 Kayden Alexander Koshelev as Brandon Jaynes, Melinda Jaynes' son and the first victim of the Grimcutty
 John Ross Bowie (special appearance)
 Nanrisa Lee as Sarah Litman, Emily's mom
 Jeff Meacha as David Litman, Emily's dad
 Kory Mann as Student 1 in the auditorium
 Terry Dexter as Laura
 Shelli Boone as Principal
 Ryan P. Shrime as Dave Bagilardi
 Justin Jarzombek as Oliver
 Mia Pollini as one of the Partygoers at Oliver's house
 Chrisaane Eastwood as Fran
 Clinton Lowe as Male Nurse
 Tamara Whatley as Receptionist
 Olabisi Kovabel as Kayla ¨Kai¨
 Malaya Valenzuela as Emily Litman, Sarah and David's daughter and Asha's best friend

Production 
Production company Capture produced and 20th Digital Studio developed the film.

Release 
The film released in United States on Hulu, in Latin America by Star+ and internationally by Disney+ on October 10, 2022.

Reception 
The film has mostly negative reviews from critics. Its approval rating on Rotten Tomatoes is 25% based on 8 reviews. Decider says to stream it, praising the cast. A review at Bloody Disgusting scored the movie 2 out of 5. Sportskeeda called the performances average. Laughing Place said it is a "fine watch if you’re looking for something new." Ready Steady Cut called it "a weak offering to the horror genre." Paste Magazine compared the film to Slender Man and called it "forgettable." Pajiba said it is "born of an interesting idea" but the execution was "unfortunately boring." A review at Nightmarish Conjurings said that "while there are the typical “teen horror” flaws, Grimcutty holds up surprisingly well." Decider said the film has a "strong cast." Mashable claims that the "scares are overshadowed by over-explanation." Common Sense Media called the monster goofy, scoring it 2 out of 5.

References

External links 

 
 
 

2022 horror films
American monster movies
2020s monster movies
Hulu original films
20th Digital Studio films
Films about siblings
American teen horror films
2020s teen horror films
Works about Internet memes
Creepypasta
Films based on Internet-based works
2020s English-language films
2020s American films